Arangi may refer to:

 Arangi, Ghazipur, Uttar pradesh -  a village in Ghazipur district, Uttar pradesh, India.
Post Office - Usia
Tahsil - Zamania
District - Ghazipur 
Pin Code - 232330
A small beautiful village with green farming fields and approximately 4000 people. 
 Arangi, Chandauli - a village in Chandauli district, Uttar pradesh, India.